Turner Broadcasting v. Federal Communications Commission, 512 U.S. 622 (1994), is the first of two United States Supreme Court cases dealing with the must-carry rules imposed on cable television companies. Turner Broadcasting v. Federal Communications Commission (II), 520 U.S. 180 (1997) was the second.  Turner I established that cable television companies were indeed First Amendment speakers but didn't decide whether the federal regulation of their speech infringed upon their speech rights. In Turner II the court decided that the must-carry provisions were constitutional.

Under the Miami Herald v. Tornillo case, it was unconstitutional to force a newspaper to run a story the editors would not have included absent a government statute because it was compelled speech which could not pass the strict scrutiny of a compelling state interest being achieved with the least restrictive means necessary to achieve the state interest. However, under the rule of Red Lion Broadcasting Co. v. FCC the High Court held that a federal agency could regulate broadcast stations (TV and radio) with far greater discretion.  In order for federal agency regulation of broadcast media to pass constitutional muster, it need only serve an important state interest and need not narrowly tailor its regulation to the least restrictive means.

Concurrence (Stevens)
Congress' policy judgment is entitled to substantial deference
Statute did not regulate the content of speech and therefore does not require the court to examine it with heightened scrutiny

See also
 List of United States Supreme Court cases, volume 512
 List of United States Supreme Court cases
 Lists of United States Supreme Court cases by volume
 List of United States Supreme Court cases by the Rehnquist Court

External links

United States Supreme Court cases
United States Supreme Court cases of the Rehnquist Court
United States Free Speech Clause case law
Broadcast law
1994 in United States case law
Federal Communications Commission litigation
Turner Broadcasting System